Botanophila is a genus of flies of the family Anthomyiidae.

Species 

List of species according to Catalogue of Life:

References

Muscoidea genera
Anthomyiidae